Beyond Re-Animator is a 2003 horror film directed by Brian Yuzna and starring Jeffrey Combs, Jason Barry, Elsa Pataky, Simón Andreu and Santiago Segura. It is the third and final installment in the Re-Animator film series.

An international co-production of Spain and the United States, Beyond Re-Animator premiered on the Sci-Fi Channel, though it was produced independently and acquired by the channel only as a distributor; this showing was cut to a TV-PG rating. The film received a limited theatrical run in the U.S. and was assigned an R rating, and a slightly longer unrated cut was released on home media in some countries.

Plot
For the past 13 years, Dr. Herbert West has been serving a prison sentence due to a murder at the hands of one of his zombies.

With what scant supplies he has on hand in the prison medical center, Dr. West has been capable of performing only extremely basic experiments on rats. However, his lack of supplies does not prevent him from uncovering a key element in his re-animation process. Dr. West has discovered "NPE" (Nano-Plasmic Energy), an energy that can be extracted from the brain of a living organism through an electrocution-like process, to be stored in a capsule resembling a small light bulb. The capsule can then be connected to a corpse and used in conjunction with West's previously developed reagent to restore the former dead to a lifelike state. The NPE prevents the degeneration seen in previous instances, where the reanimated are nothing more than mindless zombies. Used together with the re-agent, reanimated corpses regain their skills, memories, and motor functions and nearly fully resemble normal humans.

When a young doctor named Howard Phillips comes to work at the prison, West is assigned to assist the new doctor. Due to Phillips' interest in Dr. West's research, West is able to attain the supplies and tools needed to bring his experiments to the next level. It is revealed that Phillips is the younger brother of the teenage girl who was killed by West's zombie (he is shown watching West being taken away by the cops) and came to the prison for the explicit purpose of working with him. Despite his interest, Phillips still maintains an ethical reluctance to allow West's research to full completion. In the meantime, journalist Laura Olney, covering a story for her newspaper at the prison, meets and begins an affair with Dr. Phillips, and they fall in love. This new romance only temporarily postpones West's experiment, however. After the warden of the prison, also infatuated with Laura, attempts to seduce Laura himself, she resists and he angrily kills her.

Crushed by Laura's death, Dr. Phillips succumbs to Dr. West's wishes and his experiments are allowed to literally take on new life. West & Phillips revive Laura with the NPE, although it is quickly seen that the dangerous side effects of West's past work are still present with the NPE. Eventually, the warden of the prison uncovers West's experiments and moves to put an end to them, but he is killed by West, and subsequently re-animated. West uses the NPE from a prisoner's pet rat, causing some unexpected side effects in the warden's behavior. It quickly manifests itself as the prison descends into utter chaos as a riot breaks out, with vials of the reagent circulating through the population. Soon, it is unclear who is dead, who is alive, and who has been exposed to the agent.

When the chaos finally settles from the bloody prison riot, West escapes captivity before the guards appear by stealing Phillips' I.D. when he comes across Phillips weeping over Laura's decapitated body. As police and authorities take control of the prison, Phillips is dragged away as he and Laura's head start laughing. Herbert West is shown putting on his glasses outside the prison and disappears into the night to continue his research.

Cast
 Jeffrey Combs as Dr. Herbert West
 Jason Barry as Dr. Howard Phillips
 Elsa Pataky as Laura Olney
 Simón Andreu as Warden Brando
 Santiago Segura as "Speedball"
 Lolo Herrero as Sergeant Moncho
 Enrique Arce as Cabrera
 Bárbara Elorrieta as Emily Phillips
 Raquel Gribler as Nurse Vanessa
 Daniel Ortiz as Winni
 Joaquín Ortega as Officer Falcon

Reception
On the review aggregator website Rotten Tomatoes, the film holds an approval rating of 55% based on 11 critics, with an average rating of 5.30/10   Allmovie gave the film a mixed review, calling it "almost a remake of the original".  Jonathan Holland of Variety writes that the film is "sometimes shocking but rarely scary" and "calculated to appeal only to hardcore gore hounds."  In a mixed review, Patrick Naugle of DVD Verdict called it "somewhat of a letdown" but "worth at least one viewing".  Writing for Bloody Disgusting, Brad Miska rates the film 2.5/5 stars and called it "a fun movie, but nothing special".

In their book Lurker in the Lobby: A Guide to the Cinema of H. P. Lovecraft, Andrew Migliore and John Strysik write: "If your idea of Lovecraftian fun is Combs' acidic one-liners, and digitally enhanced gore effects that weren't available for the other two films, then by all means have a look. But if you're comparing this film to the still classic Re-Animator, well... This third try is only a shadow of the gonzo wit of the original and not nearly as entertaining."

Zombiemania: 80 Movies to Die For author Arnold T. Blumberg wrote that "Beyond Re-Animator is better than its immediate predecessor" and that "Combs slips back into the white shirt and black tie, wielding the hypo of green goo like he never put it down, but his performance is nicely tempered by the passage of time, giving us a West that lacks some of his youthful confidence but none of his single-minded desire to pursue 'The Work.'" Bruce G. Hallenbeck, in his book Comedy-Horror Films: A Chronological History, 1914-2008, again described Brian Yuzna's direction as "competent but uninspired", but said the film's biggest problem is that most of the cast are Spanish actors whose voices were obviously dubbed over to conceal their accents, resulting in a lack of both tension and comedy. He commented that Jeffrey Combs is still outstanding in the role of Herbert West, but his performance is muted due to a complete lack of strong co-stars to play off of.

Home media
In 2011 Arrow Video released a Special Edition DVD of the film, with the following special features:
 Audio commentary with director Brian Yuzna
 'All in the Head' Brian Yuzna on the Re-Animator Chronicles (50 mins)
 Original trailer
 Reversible cover sleeve with original and newly commissioned artwork by Tom Hodge 'The Dude Designs'
 Double-sided fold-out poster featuring new artwork
 Collector's booklet featuring 'World of Lovecraft' and an interview with star Jeffrey Combs by author and critic Calum Waddell, as well as an extract from H. P. Lovecraft's original story ‘Herbert West – Reanimator’

See also 
 List of Spanish films of 2003

References

External links
 
 
 

2003 television films
American comedy horror films
American body horror films
American science fiction horror films
American zombie comedy films
Films based on works by H. P. Lovecraft
Films directed by Brian Yuzna
Films shot in Barcelona
Films set in Massachusetts
Films scored by Richard Band
American prison films
Re-Animator (film series)
Resurrection in film
2003 comedy horror films
Television sequel films
2003 films
2000s science fiction horror films
Syfy original films
American horror television films
2000s English-language films
American drama television films
English-language Spanish films
2000s American films
2000s Spanish films